"Loser" is a song by Arjen Anthony Lucassen's progressive rock/metal opera Ayreon, originally released under the title "Day Sixteen: Loser" as a part of the 2004 album The Human Equation. It is the fifth track of the second disc, and the sixteenth track of the overall album. It was later released as the fifth single by Ayreon under the new title "Loser"; this version, very different, features several new musicians.

In the original version, lead vocals are provided by Mike Baker from Shadow Gallery, who is playing the character Father in his only album appearance. Devin Townsend provides vocals at the end of the song, in his third and final appearance as the character Rage. In addition to composing the song, Lucassen also wrote Father's lyrics; however Rage's lyrics are written by Townsend himself, as for the other songs the character is featured in.

In the single version, Peter Vink is replacing Lucassen as bass guitarist while Joost van den Broek is featured as a second keyboardist;. The most notable difference is the substitution of the original Hammond solo by Ken Hensley to a duel between Lucassen and Van den Broek.

Lyrics
The song follows the plot of the main story of the album. For more information of it, see the plot at the article of the album.
The sixteenth day is marked with a rather strange event: Father, Me's nemesis, comes to visit Me. Calling him "Loser", and belittling him as always, it is later revealed that the Father is the true loser, having had several failed marriages and with lawsuits against him by each of those wives, while half of the many neglected children he has with them are in jail. Rage reawakens and refuses Father's words, reflecting upon the intensity of Me's hatred towards him. ("You're killing it from afar, go tell it in a bar/You're killing it from afar my father!")

Music video
A music video was shot for the song. It features live footage of Star One performing the song, plus images of the band in the middle of some fields and also Mike Baker singing his part on the song.

Track listing
Loser (Star One version) - 3:31
How You Gonna See Me Now (Acoustic Alice Cooper cover, with Mike Baker) - 3:52
Into the Black Hole (Acoustic live version, with Irene Jansen) - 4:22
The Castle Hall (Acoustic version, with Irene Jansen) - 4:07

Personnel
Arjen Lucassen - All electric, acoustic and bass guitars, mandolin, lap steel guitar, keyboards, synthesisers.
Ed Warby (Gorefest, Elegy and Hail of Bullets) - drums
Mike Baker (Shadow Gallery) - vocals
Devin Townsend (Devin Townsend Band, Strapping Young Lad, Devin Townsend Project) - Vocals
Irene Jansen - Vocals
Gary Wehrkamp (Shadow Gallery) - backing vocals
Peter Vink - Bass (Loser)
Joost van den Broek (After Forever) - Keyboards (Loser and Castle Hall)
Robert Baba - Electric violin (Loser)
Jeroen Goossens - Didgeridoo (Loser)
John McManus - Flute (Loser)

References
Loser page at Ayreon's official website
Loser review at Prog-nose.com

External links
Ayreon official website

2004 singles
Ayreon songs
2004 songs